Petter Christian Singsaas (born 23 August 1972) is a Norwegian former football player, who played as a central defender, most notably for Molde. He won the Norwegian cup with Molde in 2005.

Club career
Singsaas debuted for Molde in the Tippeligaen match against Brann on 22 April 1995, and went on to play for Molde for nine seasons until 2003, had a break from top level football and returned to Molde in 2005 where he played another three seasons. He was offered a contract extension after the 2007 season, but chose to retire from football.

Career statistics

Personal life
Singsaas Currently lives in Steinkjer with his wife and two children.

His father is former referee Terje Singsaas.

Honours
Molde FK
 Norwegian Cup: 2005

References

1972 births
Living people
People from Steinkjer
Norwegian footballers
Molde FK players
Eliteserien players
Norwegian First Division players
Association football defenders
Sportspeople from Trøndelag